Gerd Qebran (also Romanized as Gerd Qebrān; also known as Anbār-e ‘Olyā, Gerū Qebrān, and Kord Qebrān) is a village in Akhtachi-ye Sharqi Rural District, Simmineh District, Bukan County, West Azerbaijan Province, Iran. At the 2006 census, its population was 631, in 102 families.

References 

Populated places in Bukan County